Angel Beats! is a 13-episode 2010 anime television series produced by P.A. Works and Aniplex and directed by Seiji Kishi. The story was originally conceived by Jun Maeda, who also wrote the screenplay and composed the music with the group Anant-Garde Eyes, with original character design by Na-Ga; both Maeda and Na-Ga are from the visual novel brand Key. The first volume in a six-part episodic visual novel adaptation produced by Key was released in 2015. The discography of Angel Beats! consists of two studio albums, one compilation album, nine singles, one soundtrack and one remix album.

The core of the discography is the original soundtrack album produced by Key Sounds Label in 2010. The music on the soundtrack was composed and arranged by Jun Maeda and members of Anant-Garde Eyes. One album and five singles for the in-story band Girls Dead Monster were released in 2010 featuring songs performed by LiSA and Marina. A theme song single was also released in 2010. A Girls Dead Monster mini-album was released in 2014. A theme song single for the visual novel version was released in 2015. Another single for Girls Dead Monster and a piano arrange album were also released in 2015. A compilation album containing previously released vocal tracks was released in 2016. Another single for Girls Dead Monster was released in 2021.

Albums

Keep The Beats!
Keep The Beats! is a studio album by Girls Dead Monster released on June 30, 2010 in Japan by Key Sounds Label bearing the catalog number KSLA-0058. A version of Keep The Beats! containing instrumental tracks was released on July 28, 2010 bundled with a 256-page band score book. The album contains one disc with 13 tracks sung by LiSA. The album is composed by Jun Maeda and arranged by Hikarishuyo.

Angel Beats! Original Soundtrack
The Angel Beats! Original Soundtrack was released on July 28, 2010 in Japan by Key Sounds Label bearing the catalog numbers KSLA-0059—0060. The soundtrack contains two discs totaling 47 tracks composed and produced by Jun Maeda and members of Anant-Garde Eyes. All of the tracks were arranged by Anant-Garde Eyes. Three artists provide vocals for three songs: Lia sings "My Soul, Your Beats!", Karuta sings "Ichiban no Takaramono (Original Version)", and Aoi Tada sings "Brave Song".

Rare Tracks
Rare Tracks is a mini studio album by Girls Dead Monster released on December 28, 2014 in Japan by Key Sounds Label bearing the catalog number KSLA-0098. The album contains one disc with three tracks sung by Marina. The album is composed by Jun Maeda and arranged by Hikarishuyo.

Holy
Holy is a piano arrange album with songs taken from the Angel Beats! anime and visual novel and arranged into piano versions. This album was released as a bonus item included with the limited edition first printing of the Windows version of Angel Beats! 1st Beat released on June 26, 2015 by Key Sounds Label bearing the catalog number KSLA-0102. As a result, it was not released for individual sale. The album contains one disc with eight tracks remixed by Ryō Mizutsuki. The album is otherwise composed and produced by Jun Maeda and Anant-Garde Eyes.

Angel Beats! Perfect Vocal Collection
Angel Beats! Perfect Vocal Collection is a compilation album of vocal music featured in the Angel Beats! anime and visual novel. It was first released on May 1, 2016 at the Character1 exhibition in Japan by Key Sounds Label bearing the catalog numbers KSLA-0113–0115. The album contains three discs with 34 tracks composed, arranged, and produced by Jun Maeda, Tomohiro Takeshita, Hikarishuyo and the group Anant-Garde Eyes. Singers on the album include: Karuta, Lia, LiSA, Marina, Suzuyu and Aoi Tada.

Singles

Crow Song
"Crow Song" is a single by Girls Dead Monster, featuring songs sung by Marina, released on April 23, 2010 in Japan by Key Sounds Label bearing the catalog number KSLA-0051. The single is composed by Jun Maeda and arranged by Hikarishuyo.

Thousand Enemies
"Thousand Enemies" is a single by Girls Dead Monster, featuring songs sung by LiSA, released on May 12, 2010 in Japan by Key Sounds Label bearing the catalog number KSLA-0052. The single is composed by Jun Maeda and arranged by Hikarishuyo. The AMG Music School provides the chorus in the third track "Highest Life".

My Soul, Your Beats! / Brave Song
"My Soul, Your Beats! / Brave Song" is a split single released on May 26, 2010 in Japan by Key Sounds Label bearing the catalog numbers KSLA-0053 (limited edition) and KSLA-0054 (regular edition). The two title tracks, performed by Lia and Aoi Tada respectively, were used as opening and ending themes to the Angel Beats! anime series. Each song is presented in full length, TV size, and instrumental versions. The single is written by Jun Maeda and arranged by the group Anant-Garde Eyes. The single debuted at No. 3 on Japan's Oricon weekly singles chart, selling about 80,000 copies in its first week of sales. It also ranked at No. 7 on Billboards Japan Hot 100.  The limited edition contained a bonus DVD containing a no-credit version of the opening and ending animation sequences used in the anime.

Little Braver
"Little Braver" is a single by Girls Dead Monster, featuring songs sung by LiSA, released on June 9, 2010 in Japan by Key Sounds Label bearing the catalog number KSLA-0055. The single is composed by Jun Maeda and arranged by Hikarishuyo.

Last Song
"Last Song" is a single by Girls Dead Monster, featuring songs sung by Marina, released on December 8, 2010 in Japan by Key Sounds Label bearing the catalog number KSLA-0064. The single is composed by Jun Maeda and arranged by Hikarishuyo.

Ichiban no Takaramono (Yui final ver.)
"Ichiban no Takaramono (Yui final ver.)" is a single by Girls Dead Monster, featuring songs sung by LiSA, released on December 8, 2010 in Japan by Key Sounds Label bearing the catalog number KSLA-0065. The single is composed by Jun Maeda and arranged by Hikarishuyo.

Heartily Song
"Heartily Song" is a single released on April 1, 2015 in Japan by Key Sounds Label bearing the catalog number KSLM-0099. The single contains the opening and ending theme songs to Angel Beats! -1st beat- sung by Lia and Suzuyu, respectively. Each song is presented in full length, game size, and instrumental versions. The single is composed by Jun Maeda and Tomohiro Takeshita, and arranged by the group Anant-Garde Eyes.

Million Star
"Million Star" is a single by Girls Dead Monster, featuring Marina, released on June 26, 2015 in Japan by Key Sounds Label bearing the catalog number KSLA-0101. The single was released to those who pre-ordered the limited edition of Angel Beats! 1st Beat. The single is composed by Jun Maeda and arranged by Hikarishuyo.

Awakening Song
"Awakening Song" is a single by Girls Dead Monster, featuring songs sung by LiSA and Marina, released on December 18, 2021 at Visual Arts Winter Fes in Japan by Key Sounds Label bearing the catalog number KSLA-0186. The single is composed by Jun Maeda and arranged by Hikarishuyo.

Charts

References

Angel Beats!
Anime soundtracks
Discographies of Japanese artists
Key Sounds Label
Video game music discographies